Koulouri may refer to:

Greek language term for the circular simit bread
Former name of Salamis Island
Singular version of koulouria